The IWA National Festival & Boat Show run by the Inland Waterways Association is one of the key annual events on the United Kingdom's inland waterways. Generally referred to as the "National" it serves several functions:

As a publicity vehicle for the IWA and inland waterways in general
To raise funds for the IWA
As a social gathering for boaters from around the country
As a campaigning event

The four functions of the event are to some extent conflicting and in recent years the campaigning aspect has been somewhat separated by the creation of an annual "Campaign Cruise".

Arguably it is as a gathering of like minded people that the National has been most influential. The festival brings together people from all over the country who do not meet in numbers except on the festival site. The original decisions to form both the Waterway Recovery Group and the National Association of Boat Owners both arose out of informal discussions held at the National.

Development
The first festival was held in 1950, inspired by car rallies which Tom Rolt, one of the founders of the Inland Waterways Association, had attended prior to the Second World War. It was held at Market Harborough, as the location was not restricted to narrowboats. The rally was called the Market Harborough Festival of Boats and Arts. The arts element of the festival was an addition made by Robert Aickman and was one of the elements that led to the eventual split between Rolt and Aickman. However, the festival was a success, and one of Rolt's innovations was the awarding of trophies for impressive service or performance, a practice that continued. The A. P. Herbert Trophy was awarded to the person who had traveled the furthest to get to the rally, and was won by Stan Offley, who had covered  and had passed through 156 locks. His route from Ellesmere Port had used the Manchester Ship Canal, the Bridgewater Canal, the Leeds and Liverpool Canal, the Aire and Calder Navigation, the River Trent and the Grand Union Canal.

Like many of the early rallies, that of 1962 was essentially a campaign to highlight the poor state of a particular waterway, in this case, the Stourbridge Canal and its connecting waterways. The decision to hold it at Stourbridge Basin was taken in late 1961, and David Hutchings, by then chairman of the rally committee, approached British Transport Waterways, the operating arm of the British Transport Commission (BTC) to ensure that the Stourbridge Branch would be dredged, to allow the boats to reach the festival site. Faced with a refusal, Hutchings hired a dragline excavator to carry out the work himself. The British Transport Commission threatened legal action against Hutchings, the Inland Waterways Association and the Staffordshire and Worcestershire Canal Society if he proceeded, but that did not stop him. His actions gained widespread media coverage, which was extremely critical of the BTC. The BTC was abolished later that year, and the rally went ahead, with British Waterways staff assisting boats through the decrepit locks. Just two years later, British Waterways and the Staffordshire and Worcestershire Canal Society agreed to work on restoring the Stourbridge Canal and the Dudley Canal, and this early example of co-operation resulted in the canals and locks reopening in 1967.

Marple Locks on the Peak Forest Canal was chosen as the site for the 1966 rally, again to highlight their condition. Access had to be along the Macclesfield Canal, as the locks themselves were derelict and could not be used. Cosmetic restoration began the following year, and the canal was reopened in 1974.

1970 was the first occasion on which the national festival was not also a campaign to save a threatened part of the waterways network. It was held at Guildford on the River Wey. Part of the reasoning for this was that the festival was proving to be very popular, and there were a limited number of places that had sufficient display space and water supply for the number of boats wanting to attend. The choice of site was not universally popular, but the rally saw the formal launching of the Waterway Recovery Group, a group of volunteers who traveled the country to carry out restoration tasks on derelict waterways.

Management of the festivals is now handled by a division of Inland Waterways Enterprises Ltd called IWA Festivals. The limited company was set up in 2001 to manage the various trading activities of the Inland Waterways Association.

IWA National Festival sites
The statistics below are mainly taken from the IWA website but are incomplete. Some of these were called rallies rather than festivals and not all were national events.

The final column shows the overall membership of the IWA in the year in question.

Bibliography

Notes

See also

List of waterway societies in the United Kingdom

External links
Inland Waterways Association

Canals in the United Kingdom
Boat shows in the United Kingdom
Boat festivals
Festivals in the United Kingdom